Anita Gutwell (later Nussgruber, 14 November 1931 – 5 January 2022) was an Austrian actress who was a leading lady in 1950s classic films.

Personal life and death 
She was married to director Rudolf Nussgruber until his death in 2001. Gutwell died in Vienna on 5 January 2022, at the age of 90.

Selected filmography
  The Forester of the Silver Wood (1954)
 The Dairymaid of St. Kathrein (1955)
 The Old Forester House (1956)
 Forest Liesel (1956)
 The Poacher of the Silver Wood (1957)
 Sebastian Kneipp (1958)
 Munchhausen in Africa (1958)
 Hohe Tannen (1960)
 Das Riesenrad (1961)
 Freud: The Secret Passion (1962)

References

External links
 

1931 births
2022 deaths
20th-century German actresses
Actors from Klagenfurt
Austrian film actresses